SingStar Queen is a competitive karaoke video game for the PlayStation 3 and PlayStation 2, developed by London Studio and published by Sony Computer Entertainment Europe. The game features the music of rock band Queen.

Gameplay
SingStar games require players to sing along with music in order to score points. Players interface with their console via SingStar USB microphones while a music video plays in the background. The pitch players are required to sing is displayed as horizontal grey bars, which function similar to a musical stave, with corresponding lyrics displayed at the bottom of the screen. The game analyses a player's pitch and compares it to the original track, with players scoring points based on how accurate their singing is. Different modes of SingStar may vary this basic pattern, but the principle is similar throughout.

SingStar includes a variety of game modes. The standard singing mode allows one or two people to sing simultaneously, either competitively or in a duet.

The PlayStation 3 version of the game supports trophies, however, older versions of the game will need to go online to get the latest patch. Future SingStar games will include the trophy patched game on the SingStar disc.

Track list

Reception

The game received "average" reviews on both platforms according to the review aggregation website Metacritic.

References

Notes

External links
 

2009 video games
Band-centric video games
Cultural depictions of Freddie Mercury
EyeToy games
Karaoke video games
London Studio games
Multiplayer and single-player video games
PlayStation 2 games
PlayStation 3 games
Queen (band)
SingStar
Sony Interactive Entertainment games
Video games based on musicians
Video games developed in the United Kingdom
fr:Singstar